Dingsheng Wang is a Chinese researcher, physicist, nanocatalyst, and professor at the Tsinghua University. He is a fellow of the Chinese Academy of Sciences.

His research publication on design concept for electrocatalysts won the 2022 Nano Research Top Papers Award.

Education and career

Dingsheng obtained a degree in physics from Beijing University in 1962. Between 1966 and 1982, he was a research assistant at the Institute of Physics, Chinese Academy of Sciences. He became a full professor in 1986.

References

Living people
Members of the Chinese Academy of Sciences
Chinese physicists
Year of birth missing (living people)
Peking University alumni
Academic staff of Tsinghua University